Thomas Henry Crampton McFall (23 June 1913 – 16 August 1986) was Dean of Ferns from 1949 until 1979.

McFall was born in 1913, educated  at Trinity College, Dublin and ordained in 1938.  After a curacy at Cashel Cathedral he was the incumbent at Fiddown until his appointment as Dean.

Notes

1913 births
1986 deaths
Alumni of Trinity College Dublin
Deans of Ferns